Walpack Township is a township in Sussex County, in the U.S. state of New Jersey. As of the 2020 United States census, the township's population was 7, a decrease of 9 (−56.3%) from the 2010 census count of 16, which in turn reflected a decline of 34 (−82.9%) from the 41 counted in the 2000 census. Walpack Township was the smallest municipality by population and one of only four municipalities in New Jersey with a population under 100 as of the 2020 Census; it had the state's third-smallest population in the 2010 census, behind Tavistock (population 5) and the now-defunct Pine Valley (population 12), both in Camden County.

The township is named from a corruption of the Lenape Native American content word "wahlpeck," which means "turn-hole," or an eddy or whirlpool, a compound of two Native American words, "woa-lac" (a hole), and "tuppeck" (a pool), though other sources attribute the name to mean "very deep water" or "sudden bend of a stream around the base of a rock".

New Jersey Monthly magazine ranked Walpack Township as its 18th best place to live in its 2008 rankings of the "Best Places To Live" in New Jersey.

History

Walpack Township dates back to October 26, 1731, when it was first mentioned as Walpake in Hunterdon County. The area covered by the present-day township was set off to Morris County upon that county's creation in 1739, and became part of the newly formed Sussex County in 1753. As of April 15, 1754, Walpack's boundaries were defined as a "precinct". Walpack was formally incorporated as a township by an act of the New Jersey Legislature on February 21, 1798. Portions of the township were taken to form Montague Township (March 26, 1759), Sandyston Township (February 26, 1762) and the now-defunct Pahaquarry Township in Warren County (December 27, 1824). Territory was gained from Stillwater Township in 1935.

The Andrew Snable House was built in 1801 and was added to the National Register of Historic Places on July 23, 1979. The Wallpack Center Historic District was added to the NRHP on July 17, 1980.

In 1955 a proposal was made by Congress for the U.S. Army Corps of Engineers to alleviate flooding on the Delaware River by constructing a dam at the site of Tocks Island. Approximately  of the surrounding land, including Walpack, were claimed under eminent domain by the government for this project and thousands of area residents were forced to move out. Although the dam was never actually constructed, the township's population has been on the decline ever since.

Judge Joseph Stamler of New Jersey Superior Court rejected a proposal for a six-day rock festival to be held in the summer of 1970 on a  site in the township, leading to the passage of standards for similar events that requires planning for traffic and safety between the organizers and local authorities, and sets limits on duration. Stamler stated that any positive benefits from such an event must be weighed against the "health, safety and welfare of the young, and the potential harm to the public".

Geography
According to the United States Census Bureau, the township had a total area of 24.88 square miles (64.45 km2), including 24.24 square miles (62.77 km2) of land and 0.65 square miles (1.68 km2) of water (2.60%). The township is located in the Minisink Valley that extends from the Delaware Water Gap north to Port Jervis, New York.

Unincorporated communities, localities and place names located partially or completely within the township include Dry Pond, Flat Brook, Flatbrookville, Haneys Mill, Harding Lake, Long Pond and Walpack Center.

The township is bordered by the municipalities of Sandyston Township and Stillwater Township in Sussex County; and by Hardwick Township in Warren County.

Demographics

2010 census

The Census Bureau's 2006–2010 American Community Survey showed that (in 2010 inflation-adjusted dollars) median household income was $108,333 (with a margin of error of +/− $155,555) and the median family income was $127,500 (+/− $88,897). Males had a median income of $ (+/− $) versus $57,813 (+/− $26,023) for females. The per capita income for the borough was $36,663 (+/− $14,435). About none of families and none of the population were below the poverty line, including none of those under age 18 and none of those age 65 or over.

2000 census
As of the 2000 United States census there were 41 people, 20 households, and 12 families residing in the township. The population density was 1.7 people per square mile (0.7/km2). There were 34 housing units at an average density of 1.4 per square mile (0.5/km2). The racial makeup of the township was 100.00% White.

There were 20 households, out of which 20.0% had children under the age of 18 living with them, 50.0% were married couples living together, 10.0% had a female householder with no husband present, and 40.0% were non-families. 40.0% of all households were made up of individuals, and 10.0% had someone living alone who was 65 years of age or older. The average household size was 2.05 and the average family size was 2.75.

In the township the population was spread out, with 19.5% under the age of 18, 2.4% from 18 to 24, 19.5% from 25 to 44, 31.7% from 45 to 64, and 26.8% who were 65 years of age or older. The median age was 49 years. For every 100 females, there were 95.2 males. For every 100 females age 18 and over, there were 106.3 males.

The median income for a household in the township was $22,250, and the median income for a family was $22,250. Males had a median income of $46,250 versus $0 for females. The per capita income for the township was $17,624. None of the population and none of the families were below the poverty line.

Government

Local government
Walpack Township is governed under the Township form of New Jersey municipal government, one of 141 municipalities (of the 564) statewide that use this form, the second-most commonly used form of government in the state. The governing body is comprised of the three-member Township Committee, whose members are elected directly by the voters at-large in partisan elections to serve three-year terms of office on a staggered basis, with one seat coming up for election each year as part of the November general election in a three-year cycle. At an annual reorganization meeting, the Township Committee selects one of its members to serve as Mayor and another as Deputy Mayor.

, members of the Walpack Township Committee are Mayor Victor J. Maglio (R, term on committee and as mayor ends December 31, 2023; term as mayor ends 2022), Deputy Mayor James Heigis (R, term on committee ends 2024; term as deputy mayor ends 2022) and Janina Wycalek (D, 2022).

In 2018, the township had an average property tax bill of $450, the lowest in the county, compared to an average bill of $7,626 in Sussex County and $8,767 statewide.

Federal, state, and county representation
Walpack Township is located in the 7th Congressional District and is part of New Jersey's 24th state legislative district.

 

Sussex County is governed by a Board of County Commissioners whose five members are elected at-large in partisan elections on a staggered basis, with either one or two seats coming up for election each year. At an annual reorganization meeting held in the beginning of January, the board selects a Commissioner Director and Deputy Director from among its members, with day-to-day supervision of the operation of the county delegated to a County Administrator. , Sussex County's Commissioners are 
Commissioner Director Anthony Fasano (R, Hopatcong, term as commissioner and as commissioner director ends December 31, 2022), 
Deputy Director Chris Carney (R, Frankford Township, term as commissioner ends 2024; term as deputy director ends 2022), 
Dawn Fantasia (R, Franklin, 2024), 
Jill Space (R, Wantage Township, 2022; appointed to serve an unexpired term) and 
Herbert Yardley (R, Stillwater Township, 2023). In May 2022, Jill Space was appointed to fill the seat expiring in December 2022 that had been held by Sylvia Petillo until she resigned from office.

Constitutional officers elected on a countywide basis are 
County Clerk Jeffrey M. Parrott (R, Wantage Township, 2026),
Sheriff Michael F. Strada (R, Hampton Township, 2022) and 
Surrogate Gary R. Chiusano (R, Frankford Township, 2023). The County Administrator is Gregory V. Poff II, whose appointment expires in 2025.

Politics
As of March 2011, there were a total of 22 registered voters in Walpack Township, of which 1 (4.5% vs. 16.5% countywide) was registered as a Democrat, 17 (77.3% vs. 39.3%) were registered as Republicans and 2 (9.1% vs. 44.1%) were registered as Unaffiliated. There were 2 voters registered as Libertarians or Greens. Among the township's 2010 Census population, 137.5% (vs. 65.8% in Sussex County) were registered to vote, including 157.1% of those ages 18 and over (vs. 86.5% countywide).

In the 2012 presidential election, Republican Mitt Romney received 10 votes (83.3% vs. 59.4% countywide), ahead of Democrat Barack Obama with 2 votes (16.7% vs. 38.2%) and other candidates with no votes (0.0% vs. 2.1%), among the 12 ballots cast by the township's 18 registered voters, for a turnout of 66.7% (vs. 68.3% in Sussex County). In the 2008 presidential election, Republican John McCain received 14 votes (70.0% vs. 59.2% countywide), ahead of Democrat Barack Obama with 3 votes (15.0% vs. 38.7%) and other candidates with 2 votes (10.0% vs. 1.5%), among the 20 ballots cast by the township's 28 registered voters, for a turnout of 71.4% (vs. 76.9% in Sussex County). In the 2004 presidential election, Republican George W. Bush received 22 votes (78.6% vs. 63.9% countywide), ahead of Democrat John Kerry with 6 votes (21.4% vs. 34.4%) and other candidates with no votes (0.0% vs. 1.3%), among the 28 ballots cast by the township's 35 registered voters, for a turnout of 80.0% (vs. 77.7% in the whole county).

In the 2013 gubernatorial election, Republican Chris Christie received 77.8% of the vote (7 cast), ahead of Democrat Barbara Buono with 22.2% (2 votes), and other candidates receiving no votes, among the 9 ballots cast by the township's 19 registered voters, for a turnout of 47.4%. In the 2009 gubernatorial election, Republican Chris Christie received 11 votes (91.7% vs. 63.3% countywide), ahead of Democrat Jon Corzine with one vote (8.3% vs. 25.7%), Independent Chris Daggett with no votes (0.0% vs. 9.1%) and other candidates with no votes (0.0% vs. 1.3%), among the 12 ballots cast by the township's 23 registered voters, yielding a 52.2% turnout (vs. 52.3% in the county).

Education
Students in kindergarten through sixth grade attend the schools of the Sandyston-Walpack Consolidated School District, together with students from Sandyston Township. The school is located in the Layton section of Sandyston Township. As of the 2018–19 school year, the district, comprised of one school, had an enrollment of 138 students and 16.9 classroom teachers (on an FTE basis), for a student–teacher ratio of 8.2:1. In the 2016–17 school year, Sandyston-Walpack had the 26th smallest enrollment of any school district in the state, with 149 students.

Students in seventh through twelfth grade from Sandyston and Walpack Townships for public school attend Kittatinny Regional High School located in Hampton Township, which also serves students who reside in Fredon Township and Stillwater Township. The high school is located on a  campus in Hampton Township, about seven minutes outside of the county seat of Newton. Kittatinny Regional High School was recognized as a National Blue Ribbon School of Excellence in 1997–98. As of the 2018–19 school year, the high school had an enrollment of 941 students and 97.5 classroom teachers (on an FTE basis), for a student–teacher ratio of 9.7:1.

Transportation

No Interstate, U.S., state or county roads enter Walpack Township. However, a few signed routes maintained by the National Park Service such as National Park Service Route 615 do enter the township.

Notable people

People who were born in, residents of, or otherwise closely associated with Walpack Township include:

 Frank Chapot (1932–2016), Olympic silver medalist equestrian

See also
 Van Campen's Inn

References

External links

Township website
Web page for Walpack Township, Sussex County, New Jersey
Sandyston-Walpack Consolidated School

Data for Sandyston-Walpack Consolidated School, National Center for Education Statistics
Kittatinny Regional High School
 

 
1798 establishments in New Jersey
Delaware Water Gap National Recreation Area
Populated places established in 1798
Township form of New Jersey government
Townships in Sussex County, New Jersey
New Jersey populated places on the Delaware River